Owler Bar is a small area of settlement and locally important road junction in the parish of Holmesfield, Derbyshire, England. It lies at an altitude of 305 metres and is just south of the county border with Sheffield, on the edge of the Peak District National Park. The junction of the roads takes the form of an unusually large roundabout, or one-way system. 
 
Despite its small size, the hamlet has two pubs: the Peacock and the Moorlands.  A cairn lies immediately north of the hamlet.  Notable residents have included rambler G. H. B. Ward.

References

Hamlets in Derbyshire
Towns and villages of the Peak District
North East Derbyshire District